Nino Qazarashvili (born 4 December 1979) is a Georgian diver. She competed in the women's 3 metre springboard event at the 1996 Summer Olympics.

References

External links
 

1979 births
Living people
Female divers from Georgia (country)
Olympic divers of Georgia (country)
Divers at the 1996 Summer Olympics
Sportspeople from Tbilisi